Enrique García-Máiquez (born Murcia, 1969) and always living in El Puerto de Santa María), is a Spanish poet: he has published four poetry books. He also writes essays, articles on literary criticism and newspaper columns. He is married and has one daughter.

In the context of contemporary Spanish poetry, Angel Luis Prieto de Paula depicts him as someone who has gotten to take it to a path of rehumanisation, in his search for an art with totalising purpose. For Abel Feu his poetry is astounding for his wit, puns and idiomatic distortions, mastery of prosody, strophic versatility, nearness and its focus on everyday life (...), all sustained in a thorough lyrical impulse and a transcendent vision. He has been anthologised several times, in the books by Magalhães, Baltanás and Feu.

In prose he has published Lo que ha llovido, an anthology of texts from his blog. He has an opinion syndicated column in the newspapers of Joly Group. He also writes poetry criticism in newspaper and specialized reviews (Clarín, Númenor, Poesía digital). He edited the literary review Nadie parecía for Renacimiento (National Prize to Edition in 2003).

Poetry 
 Haz de luz (Pre-Textos, Valencia, 1996). Villa de Cox Prize.
 Ardua mediocritas (Ánfora Nova, Rute, 1997). National Prize for Poetry "Mariano Roldán", 1996.
 Casa propia (Renacimiento, Sevilla, 2004).
 Alguien distinto (Colección Haiku. Los papeles del sitio, Valencina, 2005).
 Con el tiempo (Renacimiento, Sevilla, 2010)

Prose 
 Lo que ha llovido (Númenor, 2009).

Editor of other poets 
 De Miguel d'Ors: 2001. Poesías escogidas (Númenor, Sevilla, 2001).
 De Luis Rosales: Antología poética (Rialp, Madrid, 2005).
 De José Miguel Ibáñez Langlois: Oficio (Antología poética) (Númenor, Sevilla, 2006).
 De Pedro Sevilla: Todo es para siempre. Antología poética (Renacimiento, Sevilla 2009).

Poetry translations 
 G. K. Chesterton Lepanto y otros poemas. Poemas escogidos (Renacimiento, Sevilla, 2003).
 Mario Quintana Puntos suspensivos (antología) (Los papeles del sitio, Valencina, 2007).

Forewords 
 Pablo Moreno Prieto, De alguna manera (Altair, Sevilla, 1999).
 G. K. Chesterton, La superstición del divorcio (traducción de Aurora Rice) (Los papeles del sitio, Valencina 2007).
 Miguel d'Ors, Virutas de taller (Los papeles del sitio, Valencina 2007).
 Aquilino Duque, Los agujeros negros (Paréntesis, Sevilla, 2009).
 G. K. Chesterton, La cosa y otros artículos de fe (coedited with Aurora Rice) (Renacimiento, Sevilla 2010).

References

External links 
 His blog
 Interview in El País
 Two poems
 El lector es un fingidor

Living people
1969 births
21st-century Spanish poets
20th-century Spanish poets
20th-century Spanish male writers
Spanish male poets
21st-century Spanish male writers